Yaqub al Charkhi (Persian یعقوب الچرخی) was a Naqshbandi Sheykh and student of Khwaja Sayyid Alauddin Atar. Yaqub Charkhi was born in 762, in a village called Charkh in Logar, Afghanistan AH and died in 851. He was a Sufi master and also a reputed Islamic scholar.

His full name was Yaqūb bin Usmān bin Mahmūd. He was born around 762 AH (1360/61) and died on Saturday 5 Safar 851 AH (22 April 1447). His shrine, according to some research scholars, lies 5 kilometres West of Dushanbe the capital of Tajikistan. Yaqub al-Charkhi was teacher of famous Sufi Khwaja Ahrar

References

Naqshbandi order
Sufi religious leaders
Sufis
Founders of Sufi orders
Sufi saints
Hanafis
Maturidis
1360 births
1447 deaths